Roman Radikovich Akbashev (born 1 November 1991) is a Russian football attacking midfielder. He plays for FC Fakel Voronezh.

Club career
He made his debut in the Russian Second Division for FC Dynamo Kirov on 4 August 2011 in a game against FC Volga Ulyanovsk.

He played in the 2017–18 Russian Cup final for FC Avangard Kursk on 9 May 2018 in the Volgograd Arena against 2–1 winners FC Tosno.

On 28 January 2019, he signed a 3.5-year contract with FC Rubin Kazan. He made his Russian Premier League debut for Rubin on 7 April 2019 in a game against FC Arsenal Tula.

On 27 January 2020, he moved to FC Neftekhimik Nizhnekamsk.

Career statistics

References

1991 births
People from Sterlitamak
Sportspeople from Bashkortostan
Living people
Russian footballers
Association football midfielders
FC KAMAZ Naberezhnye Chelny players
FC Dynamo Kirov players
FC Volgar Astrakhan players
FC Avangard Kursk players
FC Rubin Kazan players
FC Neftekhimik Nizhnekamsk players
FC Fakel Voronezh players
Russian Premier League players
Russian First League players
Russian Second League players